Andreas Karl Rune Jonsson (born 3 September 1980 in Stockholm, Sweden) is an international motorcycle speedway rider. He was a member of the Sweden speedway team that won the World Cup in 2003, 2004 and 2015.

Career summary 
Jonsson won Under-21 titles at World, Scandinavian and Swedish levels and won the $100,000 first prize on offer at the 100th Speedway Grand Prix, billed as the 'Richest Minute in Motorsport'.

Andreas Jonsson has also won the Swedish Championship on seven occasions, 2006, 2007, 2009, 2010, 2011, 2013 and 2016.

In late-August 2019, he announced his retirement from motorcycle speedway.

Speedway Grand Prix results

See also 

 Sweden national speedway team
 List of Speedway Grand Prix riders
 Speedway in Sweden

References

External links 
 Official Website

1980 births
Living people
Swedish speedway riders
Speedway World Cup champions
Polonia Bydgoszcz riders
Coventry Bees riders
Lakeside Hammers riders
Expatriate speedway riders in Poland
Swedish expatriates in Poland